Jean Claude Michel Casadesus (17 July 1927 – 20 January 1972) was a French classical pianist. He was the son of the renowned pianists Robert and Gaby Casadesus, and grandnephew of Henri Casadesus and Marius Casadesus.

Jean Casadesus was born in Paris. He was taught to play piano by his parents and studied at the Conservatoire de Paris before going to the United States to continue his studies at Princeton University.

He made his debut with the Philadelphia Orchestra conducted by Eugene Ormandy in 1947 and thereafter enjoyed success as a concert pianist and also as a piano teacher, principally at the American Conservatory at Fontainebleau. His notable students include Robert D. Levin.

From 1965 until his death, Casadesus was artist in residence and instructor at the New York State University at Binghamton.

Jean and his parents performed Mozart's concertos for 2 and 3 pianos. They recorded these works with the Columbia Symphony and Cleveland Orchestra conducted by George Szell and with the Philadelphia Orchestra under the baton of Eugene Ormandy.

In 1953 he married Evie Girard, the daughter of the painter André Girard. Jean and Evie Casadesus had one child, a daughter Agnès.

Jean Casadesus died in a car crash near Renfrew, Ontario Canada on January 20, 1972. He was a passenger in one vehicle traveling between engagements. The driver was attempting to pass another vehicle when he collided head-on with another car immediately killing that vehicle's two occupants and Casadesus. Robert Casadesus died in September 1972 in Paris. Gaby, who died in 1999, is also buried there.

References

External links
Brief biography of Jean Casadesus with photographs on the Casadesus family site

1927 births
1972 deaths
20th-century French male classical pianists
Conservatoire de Paris alumni
Jean
Road incident deaths in Canada